Anti-climax or anticlimax (that is, the opposite of climax in its various meanings) may refer to:

 Anticlimax (narrative), a literary element
 Anticlimax (figure of speech), a rhetorical device
 Anticlimax (gastropod), a genus of sea snails
 Anticlimax: A Feminist Perspective on the Sexual Revolution, a 1990 book by Sheila Jeffreys